Giorgio Mariuzzo  (7 July 1939 – 16 January 2023) was an Italian screenwriter and director.

Life and career 
Born in Venice, Mariuzzo entered the cinema industry in 1968 as an assistant director, then since the mid-1970s he started writing screenplays and also directed a number of films. Best known for his collaboration with Lucio Fulci in the early 1980s, from 1985 he was mainly active on television.

Selected filmography 
 Interrabang (1969)
 La svergognata (1974)
 La novizia (1975)
 La dottoressa sotto il lenzuolo (1976)
 Apache Woman (1976, also director)
 L'insegnante al mare con tutta la classe (1980)
 La moglie in vacanza... l'amante in città (1980)
 La moglie in bianco... l'amante al pepe (1980)
 Contraband (1980)
 Mia moglie torna a scuola (1981)
 I carabbimatti (1981)
 Pierino medico della Saub (1981)
 The House by the Cemetery (1981)
 The Beyond (1981)
 Zero in condotta (1983)
 Aenigma (1987)

References

External links 
 

1939 births
2023 deaths
Film people from Venice
Italian screenwriters
Italian male screenwriters
Italian film directors